Carenum nitidipes is a species of ground beetle in the subfamily Scaritinae. It was described by Sloane in 1916.

References

nitidipes
Beetles described in 1916